Significance is a synonym for importance. It can also refer to: 
 
 Significance (magazine), a magazine published by the Royal Statistical Society and the American Statistical Association
 Significance (policy debate), a stock issue in policy debate
 Significant figures or significant digits, the precision of a numerical value
 Statistical significance, the extent to which a result is unlikely to be due to chance alone

See also
 Meaning (disambiguation)
 Significand, part of a number in floating-point representation